Renate Verbaan (born 27 October 1979) is a Dutch television presenter.

Career 

She was a video jockey at TMF Nederland from 2004 until 2006.

From 2006 till 2009 she presented RTL Travel's Hotlist.

In 2007, she participated in the television show Wie is de Mol? where she reached the final.

As of 2010 she is a UNICEF Goodwill Ambassador.

In 2011, she presented Secret Story, the Dutch adaptation of the French reality show with the same name. In that same year, she also participated in an episode of the game show De Jongens tegen de Meisjes.

She was the procession reporter in the 2013 edition of The Passion.

From 2013 till 2019 she presented Shownieuws.

In 2022, Verbaan and Winston Gerschtanowitz appeared as two robots in an episode of The Masked Singer.

Personal life 

She married Winston Gerschtanowitz in 2011. They have two sons born in 2008 and 2010.

References

External links 

 

1979 births
Living people
Dutch television presenters
Dutch female models
UNICEF Goodwill Ambassadors
Models from Rotterdam
Mass media people from Rotterdam